Elisabeth “Eli” Mayr (born 18 January 1996) is a footballer who plays as a forward for Swiss Nationalliga A club FC Basel. Born in Germany, she represents the Austria national team internationally.

Early life
Mayr was raised in Brunnthal.

References

1996 births
Living people
People with acquired Austrian citizenship
Austrian women's footballers
Women's association football forwards
Kansas Jayhawks women's soccer players
FC Basel Frauen players
Swiss Women's Super League players
Austria women's international footballers
Austrian expatriate women's footballers
Austrian expatriate sportspeople in the United States
Expatriate women's soccer players in the United States
Austrian expatriate sportspeople in Switzerland
Expatriate women's footballers in Switzerland
People from Munich (district)
Footballers from Munich
German women's footballers
FC Bayern Munich (women) players
Bayer 04 Leverkusen (women) players
2. Frauen-Bundesliga players
Frauen-Bundesliga players
German people of Austrian descent
German expatriate women's footballers
German expatriate sportspeople in the United States
German expatriate sportspeople in Switzerland
Sportspeople from Upper Bavaria